Christoph Herle (born 19 November 1955 in Königstein im Taunus, Hessen) is a retired West German long-distance runner who specialized in the 10000 metres and cross-country running.  His first major international track race occurred in the 1978 European Athletics Championships in Prague, former Czechoslovakia, where he placed fourteenth in the 5,000-metre final (see Tapio Pekola et al., eds., "European Championships Prague" / EM-Praha, Kaarina, Finland:  Publications Company Runner / Juoksija, 1978).  He ran slightly better in the 1982 European Athletics Championships 5,000-metre final in Athens, Greece, placing thirteenth (see Markku Siukonen and Matti Aho, eds., "The Great European Championships Book" / Suuri EM-kirja, Jyväskylä, Finland:  Sportti Kustannus / Sport Publications Oy / Ltd., 1990).  Herle ran best in 1983 and 1984, placing eighth at the 1983 World Championships in Athletics – Men's 10,000 metres in Helsinki, Finland (see, for example, Mikko S. Laitinen et al., eds., "World Athletics Championships 1983" / Yleisurheilun maailmanmestaruuskilpailut 1983, Salt Lake City, Utah, USA:  International Sport Publications, 1983), and fifth at the final in the Athletics at the 1984 Summer Olympics – Men's 10,000 metres final in Los Angeles, the United States (see, for example, "The Big Olympic Book 4" / Suuri Olympiateos 4, published in Finland in 1984).  He never managed to break through to the very top of international long-distance runners, however.  His final major international championships race was the 1986 European Athletics Championships 10,000-metre race in Stuttgart, then West Germany, where he placed a disappointed fifteenth (see Siukonen and Aho, eds., "The Great European Championships Book").

Achievements

References
 
 

1955 births
Living people
West German male long-distance runners
Athletes (track and field) at the 1984 Summer Olympics
Olympic athletes of West Germany
Sportspeople from Darmstadt (region)
People from Hochtaunuskreis